Frank Hutchison (25 January 1897 – 17 December 1990) was a New Zealand cricketer. He played six first-class matches for Otago between 1917 and 1920.

See also
 List of Otago representative cricketers

References

External links
 

1897 births
1990 deaths
New Zealand cricketers
Otago cricketers
Cricketers from Dunedin